Houssem Louati (born 12 May 1992) is a Tunisian professional footballer who plays as an attacking midfielder for  club Ansar.

Career
On 16 September 2020, Louati moved to Saudi Second Division side Al-Riyadh on a one-year contract; he reunited with former Ansar teammate El Hadji Malick Tall. Louati scored six goals during the 2020–21 season. After returning to Tunisia, where he played for US Tataouine during the 2021–22 Tunisian Ligue Professionnelle 1, Louati moved back to Ansar in July 2022.

Honours
Ansar
 Lebanese Elite Cup runner-up: 2022

Individual
 Lebanese Premier League Team of the Season: 2018–19
 Lebanese Premier League top assist provider: 2018–19

References

External links

 
 
 
 

1992 births
Living people
People from Sfax
Tunisian footballers
Association football midfielders
CS Sfaxien players
Al Ansar FC players
Al-Riyadh SC players
US Tataouine players
Tunisian Ligue Professionnelle 1 players
Lebanese Premier League players
Saudi Second Division players
Tunisian expatriate footballers
Tunisian expatriate sportspeople in Lebanon
Tunisian expatriate sportspeople in Saudi Arabia
Expatriate footballers in Lebanon
Expatriate footballers in Saudi Arabia